Panteleimonivka is an urban-type settlement in Horlivka municipality, Horlivka Raion of Donetsk Oblast in eastern Ukraine, at 34.3 km NE from the centre of Donetsk city. On May 15, 2022, the Donetsk People's Republic militia took control over the settlement from the Ukrainian Armed Forces.

History 

The settlement was taken under control of pro-Russian forces During the War in Donbass, that started in 2014.

Transport 
A railway station.

Demographics
Native language as of the Ukrainian Census of 2001:
Ukrainian 21.16%
Russian 78.11%
Armenian 0.06%
Belarusian and Romanian 0.02%
Moldavian 0.01%

References

Urban-type settlements in Horlivka Raion